Kepler-19 (TYC 3134-1549-1, 2MASS J19214099+3751064, GSC 03134-01549, KOI-84) is a G7V star that is host to planets Kepler-19b, Kepler-19c, and Kepler-19d. It is located five arcminutes northwest of the much more distant open cluster NGC 6791.

Planetary system
There are three known planets in the Kepler-19 planetary system. Planet b was discovered by the transit method, c by transit-timing variations and d by radial velocity measurements.

References

External links
 NASA, Kepler mission, Table of Confirmed Planets

Lyra (constellation)
G-type main-sequence stars
Planetary systems with three confirmed planets
Planetary transit variables
84
J19214099+3751064